The 1979 Fiesta Bowl was the ninth edition of the college football bowl game, played at Sun Devil Stadium in Tempe, Arizona on Tuesday, December 25. Part of the 1979–80 bowl game season, it matched the tenth-ranked independent Pittsburgh Panthers and the unranked Arizona Wildcats of the Pacific-10 Conference (Pac-10). Favored Pittsburgh never trailed and won 16–10.

This was the last of four consecutive Fiesta Bowls played on Christmas Day.

Teams

Pittsburgh

This was Pittsburgh's second Fiesta Bowl appearance; the first was six years earlier.

Arizona

Despite finishing third in the Pac-10 with an overall record of 6–4–1, Arizona was invited; it was their first bowl appearance in eleven years.

Game summary
Televised by NBC, the game kicked off on Christmas Day shortly after 1:30 p.m. MST.

Pittsburgh kicker Mark Schubert gave his team a lead they never relinquished with two field goals for a 6–0 lead at halftime. Arizona responded with a Brett Weber field goal, but Panther tight end Benjie Pryor caught a touchdown pass from true freshman quarterback Dan Marino to increase the lead to 13–3 at the end of three quarters.

Schubert added a third field goal, but Arizona halfback Hubert Oliver scored from a yard out to close the margin to six points at 16–10. After Pittsburgh punted the ball back, the Wildcats looked to drive for the winning points with 1:05 left. But just seven seconds later, quarterback Jim Krohn's pass was intercepted by Terry White and the Panthers won their first Fiesta Bowl.

Schubert was the first kicker named offensive MVP.

Scoring
First quarter
 Pittsburgh – Mark Schubert 46-yard field goal
Second quarter
 Pittsburgh – Schubert 36-yard field goal
Third quarter
 Arizona – Brett Weber 38-yard field goal
 Pittsburgh – Benjie Pryor 12-yard pass from Dan Marino (Schubert kick)
Fourth quarter
 Pittsburgh – Schubert 46-yard field goal
 Arizona – Hubert Oliver 1-yard run (Bill Zivic kick)

Statistics
{| class=wikitable style="text-align:center"
! Statistics !! Pittsburgh !! Arizona
|-
| First Downs ||20||20
|-
| Yards Rushing||44–127||38–91
|-
| Yards Passing ||172||226
|-
| Passing ||15–29–2||18–35–3
|-
| Return Yards ||37||46
|-
| Total Offense ||73–299||73–317
|-
|Punts–Average ||5–34.2||4–39.8
|-
|Fumbles–Lost ||1–0||2–1
|-
|Turnovers||2||4
|-
|Penalties–Yards ||10–89||7–85
|}

Aftermath
Pittsburgh returned to the Fiesta Bowl four years later, but  have yet to win another. Arizona finally won a bowl game in 1986, and returned to the Fiesta Bowl in 1994.

References

External links
 Fiesta Bowl – December 25, 1979

Fiesta Bowl
Fiesta Bowl
Arizona Wildcats football bowl games
Pittsburgh Panthers football bowl games
Fiesta Bowl
December 1979 sports events in the United States